Unirea National College is a high school in Târgu Mureș, Romania. It was founded in 1919, after the Union of Transylvania with Romania, as the successor of the local Girls' Economic School. In 1959 it was named "Unirea" and it was moved to its present-day building, which was originally built in 1903−1905 for a Hungarian Catholic college founded in 1702.

External links 

  Official site

Education in Târgu Mureș
Buildings and structures in Târgu Mureș
Schools in Mureș County
National Colleges in Romania
Educational institutions established in 1919
1919 establishments in Romania